Lincoln Michael Riley (born September 5, 1983) is an American college football coach and former player who is the head coach of the USC Trojans football program at the University of Southern California.

He previously served as the head coach at the University of Oklahoma for five seasons from 2017 to 2021, where he won four consecutive Big 12 Championship Games.

Playing quarterback himself as a walk-on player at Texas Tech and known for his "Air Raid" offensive scheme, Riley has mentored three Heisman Trophy winners at quarterback (Baker Mayfield, Kyler Murray, and Caleb Williams) as well as another starting NFL quarterback in Jalen Hurts. As a fifth-year head coach, he has produced over 28 draft picks including 5 first-rounders, but is 1-4 in end-of-season bowl games.

Early career
Riley ran track at Muleshoe High School in Muleshoe, a small town of roughly 5,000 in West Texas. He began his high school career at defensive end and made the move to quarterback for his junior and senior seasons. Riley played quarterback at Texas Tech University as a walk-on in 2002, behind senior starter and future Texas Tech coach Kliff Kingsbury and back-up B. J. Symons.

Coaching career

Early career
In 2003, Riley became a student assistant to Mike Leach, gradually progressing to graduate assistant and then to receivers coach. Following his departure from Texas Tech after the firing of Leach, Riley went on to serve five seasons as offensive coordinator at East Carolina University under Ruffin McNeill.

Oklahoma

Riley was hired by Bob Stoops to be the offensive coordinator for the Oklahoma Sooners on January 12, 2015. In his first season at Oklahoma, Riley led the Sooners to the 7th ranked offense in the country while Bob Stoops led the Sooners to the College Football Playoff. He also won the Broyles Award, awarded the nation's top assistant coach. On June 7, 2017, Bob Stoops retired as head coach and Riley was named his successor. In the 2017 season, Riley, anchored by Heisman winner Baker Mayfield, led his team to the Big 12 conference championship, a No. 2 ranking in the College Football Playoff ranking, and a berth in one of the CFP semifinal games at the Rose Bowl. Oklahoma went on to lose the 2018 Rose Bowl to Georgia, in double overtime, 54–48. It was the first of three consecutive 12–2 seasons for the Sooners under Riley. Moreover, OU won the 2017, 2018, 2019, and 2020 Big 12 Championship Games during Riley's tenure there. As of the day he had left, Oklahoma (and Riley) had won all four of the revived Big XII Championship Games since the conference resumed them. However, the Sooners had already been eliminated from contention for the Big XII Championship Game for the 2021 season and would soon to move to a new conference.

Riley finished his tenure at Oklahoma with a 55–10 record and the highest winning percentage in the history of coaches at the OU program. In his relatively brief time there, he mentored two quarterbacks who won the Heisman Trophy: Baker Mayfield and Kyler Murray in consecutive seasons - both quarterbacks who were transfers and had already progressed under other staffs. Another who did not win the trophy, Jalen Hurts, went on to an NFL career as a starting pro quarterback for the Philadelphia Eagles.

Fox Sports Radio and other sources reported that Riley was unhappy with Oklahoma's decision to move to the Southeastern Conference (SEC) from their traditional home in the Big 12 Conference. OU's Athletic Director Joe Castiglione countered that Riley had been "on board" with Oklahoma's shift to the SEC.

USC
On November 28, 2021, Riley was named the 30th head coach of the USC Trojans football program representing the University of Southern California, replacing Clay Helton. The move was widely praised in Los Angeles area media, with the Los Angeles Daily News calling it a walk-off home run hire for the Trojans after Riley's "brilliant" five years at Oklahoma, predicting that Riley would revive and transform not only USC football, but also Pac-12 football in general and all of "football in the western third of the country." The Los Angeles Times pointed out that Riley "still has an itch to scratch when it comes to winning at the highest level of the sport" and must feel he can "reach the summit more easily from USC." Riley himself cited, in an interview given to SportsCenter two days later, the "history and tradition of one of the greatest college football programs of all time, the city, the Mecca of sports right here in Los Angeles" were what had lured him over to USC. Riley stated it was "tough" to leave Oklahoma but he "knew it was the right thing."

Lincoln Riley and the USC Trojans started the season off hot going 6-0 but would fall to the #20 Utes 43–42 on October 15, 2022. The Trojans won the rest of their regular season games, finishing the season ranked #4. In the Pac-12 Championship Game they would lose to the Utes again, 47-24, knocking them out of contention for the College Football Playoff. USC faced the Tulane Green Wave in the Cotton Bowl, losing 46-45 in the last few seconds.

Against rivals

With Oklahoma
Riley left Oklahoma with a 10–2 career record against the Sooners' biggest football rivals.

Texas
Riley won his last four consecutive games in the Red River Showdown rivalry against the Texas Longhorns, leaving with a record of 5–1. His only loss came in his second year, 2018, but his Sooners soon had their revenge in the 2018 Big 12 Championship Game, defeating that same Texas team in that same year with a conference championship on the line. This was the first time Oklahoma and Texas had played twice in the same year since 1903.

Oklahoma State
Riley finished 4–1 against the in-state rival Oklahoma State Cowboys. His Sooners lost only his final game against the Cowboys, which put No. 7 OSU into its first Big 12 Championship Game and was played just one day before Riley took the job with the Trojans. Since Oklahoma lost 27-14 to Baylor in Waco, the Bears earned the right to play Oklahoma State—who had placed 1st in the Big 12 standings—in the Big 12 Championship in Arlington.

Nebraska
The once famous Nebraska–Oklahoma football rivalry against the Cornhuskers was played only once in Riley's tenure. His Sooners won their only rivalry game, in 2021, 23–16.

Head coaching record

Personal life
Riley graduated from Texas Tech in 2006 with a bachelor's degree in exercise and sports science. He has a wife and two daughters. His younger brother, Garrett Riley, currently serves as the offensive coordinator at Clemson University, and was previously the running backs coach at Appalachian State.

References

External links
 Oklahoma profile
 East Carolina profile
 Texas Tech profile

1983 births
Living people
American football quarterbacks
East Carolina Pirates football coaches
Oklahoma Sooners football coaches
Texas Tech Red Raiders football coaches
Texas Tech Red Raiders football players
USC Trojans football coaches
Sportspeople from Lubbock, Texas
People from Muleshoe, Texas
Coaches of American football from Texas
Players of American football from Texas